Staffordshire Fire and Rescue Service is the statutory fire and rescue service responsible for fire protection, prevention, intervention and emergency rescue in the county of Staffordshire and unitary authority of Stoke-on-Trent. Staffordshire shares the majority of its border with Derbyshire, Cheshire, West Midlands (County) and Shropshire; although, in much shorter stretches, the county also butts up against Worcestershire, Warwickshire and Leicestershire.

, the fire service functions under the control of the Staffordshire Police and Crime Commissioner acting as the Fire & Rescue Authority.

The county provides considerable risks to its residents and firefighters. These include the industrial city of Stoke-on-Trent and the large industrial towns of Burton-upon-Trent, Stafford, Newcastle-under-Lyme, Tamworth and Cannock.

The M6 motorway runs through the county, as does the M6 Toll road. The main 'A‘ roads the A5, A50, A34 and A38 also cross the county. These well-used routes are regularly the scene of numerous road traffic accidents, vehicle fires and chemical incidents.

There are also many significant rural risks in Staffordshire: The medieval hunting grounds of Cannock Chase is designated as an Area of Outstanding Natural Beauty (AONB), and is made up of heathland, chaseland and forest that stretches between Stafford, Cannock, Rugeley and Chase Terrace. These areas pose a considerable risk of wildfires, and regularly keep firefighters extremely busy during hot dry spells. Also, the moorlands offer their own logistical difficulties during harsh winters, particularly to the residents of the towns and villages dotted throughout the hills - towns like Leek and Biddulph, and the villages of Ipstones and Longnor amongst others.

Organisation 

The service is run under the command of the Chief Fire Officer and an executive board, and provides emergency response from 33 strategically located fire stations, divided into three delivery groups:
 Northern
 Eastern
 Western

Staffordshire Fire and Rescue Service has its headquarters and training school at Pirehill near the town of Stone in mid-Staffordshire. Their fire control centre used to be at Pirehill, but was closed after its amalgamation with fire control of the West Midlands Fire Service in March 2014. Both brigades operate under a joint control centre situated in Birmingham. The county's maintenance workshops are located at the Joint Emergency Transport Facility in Trentham Lakes industrial park, a joint workshop with Staffordshire Police.

Of the 33 strategically located fire stations, only Stafford, Tamworth Belgrave and Sandyford operate on a completely 24/7 wholetime duty system.

Longton, Hanley, Newcastle-under-Lyme, Cannock and Burton-upon-Trent operate as wholetime plus retained stations (WDS/RDS), which means, along with a 24-hour station-based complement of firefighters, they have retained on-call "back-up" personnel that, when required, crew the second fire engine housed at the fire station, as well as some of the specialist appliances that may be stationed there. All wholetime firefighters work the four "watch" system. This produces an eight-day rota, with crews operating on a "two-days-on, two-nights-on, four-days-off" system.

Leek and Lichfield fire stations operate as day-crewed and retained: firefighters respond from the fire station as wholetime firefighters between the hours of 8:00am and 6:00pm with a retained on-call crew available if needed to crew other appliances based at the station. After 6:00pm the stations become retained on-call only, and the fire appliances are crewed by the same firefighters but not from the station itself.

All other Staffordshire fire stations operate the "on-call" retained duty system. All retained firefighters respond from home or work, and are notified by a pager, and, therefore, have to live or work within five minutes driving time of their station to meet strict Home Office response times.

Austerity, budget cuts and modernisation 

After the financial crisis of 2007 and 2008, the British government adopted austerity measures.

By 2009, austerity had seen 70 full-time firefighter jobs lost in Staffordshire alone. Then between 2011 and 2015 Staffordshire Fire and Rescue Service were forced to make a £4 million saving. In 2016 they had a further £1.5million cut from their £45million annual budget.

Along with firefighters, appliances were lost too. Burton-upon-Trent and Newcastle-under-Lyme each used to operate two wholetime fire engines and one retained. Both stations had a wholetime pump replaced by a 'targeted response vehicle': a smaller fire appliance based on a Mercedes-Benz van chassis. Several of these appliances were purchased over the next few years, and were used in place of conventional full-sized fire engines. Reports of their effectiveness were mixed, but eventually all but one of them has been retired or mothballed. Today only Lichfield operate one, and is crewed by their retained sector.

Hanley in Stoke-on-Trent city centre used to operate a turntable ladder high-reach appliance, but it was never replaced when it was retired. County town Stafford once operated two wholetime pumps, a high-reach aerial ladder platform, a rescue tender and a rope rescue unit. Today it just operates one wholetime pump and the ageing Land Rover rope rescue unit. Its hydraulic platform and rescue tender were not replaced upon their retirement, and their second pump transferred to the newly built Rising Brook retained fire station on the opposite side of the town.

Burslem fire station in Stoke-on-Trent was once a wholetime/retained station operating two pumps and a foam tender, but when in 2011 a new one-pump wholetime fire station became operational at Sandyford near Tunstall, Stoke-on-Trent, Burslem fire station became a single-pump retained set-up, with their foam capability transferring to Cheadle. At the same time the two-pump day-crewed/retained station at Kidsgrove to the north of Stoke lost their day-crewed pump, becoming a one-pump retained station.

The two-pump retained fire stations of Uttoxeter, Cheadle and Wombourne each lost their water tender in 2007. With two-pump retained Rugeley and Stone losing theirs in 2016.

In 2010/2011, Staffordshire Fire and Rescue Service began a major fire station rebuild and modernisation programme. The £100M required to build twenty-two 'community fire stations' and to modernise six others came from a PFI initiative. The towns of Stafford and Tamworth also gained a second fire station to enable firefighters to meet strict attendance times in the congested towns. The extensive rebuild was divided into two phases:

 Phase One: Complete rebuilds at Burslem, Cannock, Hanley, Kidsgrove, Newcastle-under-Lyme and Uttoxeter; with brand-new additional stations at Rising Brook (Stafford) and Sandyford (Stoke-on-Trent); two new stations in Tamworth to replace the one existing station located in the town centre which found itself far enough away from the newly built areas of the rapidly growing town to merit a second station to meet strict response times. The two new stations are designated as Tamworth Belgrave (wholetime) and Tamworth Mercia (retained on-call). Phase One also saw significant refurbishments at Biddulph, Barton-under-Needwood, Cheadle, Gnosall, Longnor and Wombourne.
 Phase Two: Complete rebuilds at Burton-upon-Trent, Chase Terrace, Codsall (now designated as Bilbrook & Codsall), Kinver, Leek, Lichfield, Loggerheads (to replace nearby Ashley fire station which closed when the new station became operational), Longton (Stoke-on-Trent), Penkridge, Rugeley and Stone.

Performance
In 2018/2019, every fire and rescue service in England and Wales was subjected to a statutory inspection by Her Majesty's Inspectorate of Constabulary and Fire & Rescue Services (HIMCFRS). The inspection investigated how well the service performs in each of three areas. On a scale of outstanding, good, requires improvement and inadequate, Staffordshire Fire and Rescue Service was rated as follows:

See also 
 Fire service in the United Kingdom
 Staffordshire Police
 West Midlands Ambulance Service
 List of British firefighters killed in the line of duty

References

External links 

 
Staffordshire Fire and Rescue Service at HMICFRS

Local government in Staffordshire
Fire and rescue services of England